Trigg County is a county located on the far southwestern border of the U.S. state of Kentucky. As of the 2020 census, the population was 14,061.  Its county seat is Cadiz. Formed in 1820, the county was named for Stephen Trigg, an officer in the American Revolutionary War who was killed at the Battle of Blue Licks, now in Robertson County, Kentucky. It was a victory for British and allied troops.

Following the Prohibition era, Trigg continued as a prohibition or dry county until 2009. That year the county's voters narrowly approved a referendum to repeal the prohibition on alcohol sales for off-premises consumption.

Trigg County is part of the Clarksville, TN–KY Metropolitan Statistical Area.

History
Trigg County was formed in 1820 from portions of Christian County and Caldwell counties, as its population had increased.

Trigg County was named in honor of Lt. Col. Stephen Trigg, of Virginia. Trigg had settled near Harrodsburg, Kentucky; during the American Revolutionary War, he served as an officer for the rebels and was killed on August 19, 1782, in the Battle of Blue Licks.

Geography

Adjacent counties
 Lyon County  (north)
 Caldwell County  (northeast)
 Christian County  (east)
 Stewart County, Tennessee  (south)
 Calloway County  (southwest)
 Marshall County  (northwest)

National protected area
 Land Between the Lakes National Recreation Area (part)

Demographics

As of the census of 2000, there were 12,597 people, 5,215 households, and 3,765 families residing in the county. The racial makeup of the county was 88.34% White, 9.79% Black or African American, 0.21% Native American, 0.25% Asian, 0.01% Pacific Islander, 0.18% from other races, and 1.22% from two or more races.  0.90% of the population were Hispanic or Latino of any race.

There were 5,215 households, out of which 29.10% had children under the age of 18 living with them, 60.20% were married couples living together, 8.40% had a female householder with no husband present, and 27.80% were non-families. 25.00% of all households were made up of individuals, and 11.60% had someone living alone who was 65 years of age or older.  The average household size was 2.39 and the average family size was 2.84.

In the county, the population was spread out, with 22.90% under the age of 18, 6.80% from 18 to 24, 26.70% from 25 to 44, 27.00% from 45 to 64, and 16.60% who were 65 years of age or older.  The median age was 40 years. For every 100 females, there were 96.90 males.  For every 100 females age 18 and over, there were 94.10 males.

The median income for a household in the county was $33,002, and the median income for a family was $40,886. Males had a median income of $31,158 versus $22,081 for females. The per capita income for the county was $17,184.  About 8.80% of families and 12.30% of the population were below the poverty line, including 13.20% of those under age 18 and 14.70% of those age 65 or over.

Media

Radio stations
 WKDZ-FM 106.5 (country music)
 WKDZ-AM 1110 AM & 100.9 FM (oldies)
 WHVO 1480 AM & 96.5 F.M (oldies)

Newspapers
The Cadiz Record

Communities

City
 Cadiz (county seat)

Census-designated place
 Cerulean

Other unincorporated places

 Black Hawk (partially in Caldwell County)
 Buffalo
 Caledonia
 Canton
 Donaldson
 Fenton
 Linton
 Montgomery
 Oak Grove
 Roaring Spring
 Rockcastle
 Wallonia

Ghost town
 Golden Pond

Politics
Trigg County is governed by a Fiscal Court, which is led by a Judge-Executive. The current Judge-Executive is Hollis Alexander (a Republican).  Alexander was appointed to the position by the governor in 2013 after Stanley H. Humphries, former officeholder, was elected to the Kentucky State Senate from District 1.

Notable people
 Coy Bacon, NFL player
 Darcy C. Coyle, university president
 John Egerton, journalist 
 Joe Bolton, poet
 Charles Tyler, musician
 Boots Randolph, musician
 Roger Vinson, U.S. District Court judge
 Hugh "Riccardo" Martin, opera singer

See also
 Eggner Ferry Bridge
 National Register of Historic Places listings in Trigg County, Kentucky

References

External links
 Trigg County Public Schools, Kentucky
 Official Homepage

 
Kentucky counties
Clarksville metropolitan area
1820 establishments in Kentucky
Populated places established in 1820